Jerzy Nowak (20 June 1923 – 26 March 2013) was a Polish film and theatre actor and teacher.

Biography
During World War II, Nowak fought with the Polish partisans. In 1948, he graduated from the Ludwik Solski Academy for the Dramatic Arts in Kraków.

From 1994 on, Nowak primarily and continuously played the role of Singer Hirsch, who is a historic character in the legacy of Polish theater.

In cinema, he mostly took on supporting roles as a Jew, often set during World War Two, such as in Schindler's List (directed by Steven Spielberg), or as a 'bumpkin farmer' in Three Colors: White, and as the great creative Zucker in the film The Promised Land ( directed by Andrzej Wajda).

In 2005, he made a film on the subject of death, after allegedly learning of his own illness. In his will, his corpse was to be processed in formalin by Jagiellonian University Medical College. In 2007 the documentary  Existence, directed by Marcin Koszalka focuses on the problem of death. The film attracted considerable media interest, and the rumors about the actor's disease has been denied.

In autumn 2009, Austeria Publishing House released the biography of Jerzy Nowak,Book of Love, written in collaboration with his wife, who in February 2010 was awarded the prize Kraków Book of the Month

Filmography 

Podhale w ogniu (1956)
Zagubione uczucia (1957) - Shop assistant (uncredited)
Dezerter (1958) - Klein
The Eagle (1959) - Mate Sznuk
Miejsce na ziemi (1960) - Doctor (uncredited)
Spotkania w mroku (1960) - Worker
Rok pierwszy (1960) - Mlynarz
Kwiecień (1961) - Postman
Koniec naszego świata (1964) - Blockfiihrer
Nieznany (1964) - Camp Postman
Pięciu (1964) - Alfred Buchta
Lenin v Polshe (1966)
Sobótki (1966)
Kochankowie z Marony (1966) - Fisherman (uncredited)
Jowita (1967) - participant dressed as a pirate prom
Sciana czarownic (1967) - Bartender
Cala naprzód (1967) - Chief of Boat
Stajnia na Salvatorze (1968)
Shchit i mech (1968)
Kopernik (1973) - Uczestnik procesji mnicha Mateusza (uncredited)
Opowiesc w czerwieni (1974) - Gamekeeper
The Promised Land (1975) - Zucker
Czerwone i biale (1975) - Zyd
Zofia (1976) - Kelner w mordowni
Ptaki, ptakom... (1977) - Barcik
Amateur (1979) - Stanislaw Osuch, the head of Philip
Sekret Enigmy (1979) - Alexander Cadogan
Umarli rzucaja cien (1979) - Dziadek
Szansa (1979) - Teacher Molda
Placówka (1979) - Innkeeper Josef Szatzman
Elegia (1979) - Old German
The family Gąsieniców (1979, TV Series) - Szymek Polowacz
Mission (1980, TV Series) - James Gutman
Wsciekly (1980) - St. Okrzesik
Zielone lata (1980)
Na wlasna prosbe (1980) - Tomkowski
Sowizdrzal Swietokrzyski (1980) - Florianek
From a Far Country (1981) - Professor
Krab i Joanna (1982) - Grzegorz Zaruba
Do góry nogami (1983)
Oko proroka (1984) - Jost Fok
A Year of the Quiet Sun (1984) - English Doctor
Nie bylo slonca tej wiosny (1984) - Josek
Zánik samoty Berhof (1984) - Florian
Mgla (1985) - Grandfather
Przeklete oko proroka (1985)
Medium (1985) - Ernest Wagner
Wherever You Are... (1988) - Officer-Interpreter
La bottega dell'orefice (1988) - Professor (uncredited)
And the Violins Stopped Playing (1988) - Prof. Epstein
A Tale of Adam Mickiewicz's 'Forefathers' Eve' (1989) - Choir
Alchemik (1989) - Prince Kiejstut
Kapital, czyli jak zrobic pieniadze w Polsce (1990) - Serafin
Szwadron (1992) - Lejba
Schindler's List (1993) - Investor #2
Three Colors: White (1994) - the old farmer
Legenda Tatr (1995) - Innkeeper
Lagodna (1995) - Shopkeeper
Gnoje (1995) - Old Man Hrycko
Brother of Our God ( Our God's Brother) (1997) - Anthony
Love Stories (1997) - Ankieter
Egzekutor (1999) - Kozar
Når nettene blir lange (2000) - Olek
Quo Vadis (2001) - Christian Crispus
Gebürtig (2002) - Zwei alte Juden
Eukaliptus (2002) - Pancho
Julia returns home (2002) - Mieczyslaw 'Mietek' Makowsky
The Hexer (2002, TV Mini-Series) - Vesemir
The Revenge (2002) - Michal Kafar (bricklayer #1)
Csoda Krakkóban (2004) - Grzegorz mester
Scratch (2008) - Leon
Children of Irena Sendler (2009, TV Movie) - Elderey Rabbi
Mistyfikacja (2010) - Askenazy
Legenda o Lietajúcom Cypriánovi (2010) - Bernard
Obława (2012) - Wiarus
Sierpniowe niebo. 63 dni chwaly (2013) - Leonard (final film role)

Awards and prizes
 Partisan Cross (1964)
 Gold Cross of Merit (1979)
 Gold Medal Gloria Artis (2008)
 Gold Badge "for his contribution to Krakow" (1977)
 Award at the Fourth National Festival of One Actor in Wrocław and in the one-woman show The real defense of Socrates Kostas Varnalisa in Old Theatre in Krakow (1969)
 Emphasis on XXVI Festival of Polish Contemporary Art in Wroclaw for the role of the Father in the play Bruno Henry Dederko, dir. Andruckiego Jack (1987)
 Award for the eighteenth Theatre in Opole Konfronracjach Opole for his role in The Marriage of the Jew Wyspiański, dir. Andrzej Wajda in the Old Theatre. Helena Modjeska in Cracow (1993)
 Grand Prize at XXX National Review Teatrrów Small Form Hirsch for his role in the play Singer I am a Jew from "The Wedding" by the story Roman Brandstaetter directed. Tadeusz Malak in the Old Theatre. Helena Modjeska in Cracow (1995)
 "Louis" – Krakow theater community award for the title role in the play Mr. Paul Dorst in the Association of Theatre "Steam" (2001)
 Award for Comedy Festival Talia in Tarnow for his role in monodramie Womanish choice by The rock Podhale Casimir Break-Tetmajera from the Association "Moliere" in Cracow (2004)
 Kraków Book of the Month – the award for his book The Book of Love (2010)

References

External links
 

1923 births
2013 deaths
Male actors from Kraków
Polish educators
Polish male film actors
Polish male stage actors
Recipients of the Medal for Merit to Culture – Gloria Artis
Recipients of the Gold Cross of Merit (Poland)
People from Brzesko
Home Army members
Burials at Rakowicki Cemetery